Hazenite is a hydrous phosphate mineral with chemical formula of , therefore a hydrous alkali magnesium phosphate. It is a member of the struvite group.

It was first described for an occurrence adjacent to Mono Lake, California, and named after Robert M. Hazen of the Carnegie Institute. It was approved as a new mineral on February 28, 2008 by the Commission on New Minerals of the International Mineralogical Association.

It occurs as crystal clusters associated with decomposed cyanobacteria remnants on calcite or aragonite. It is precipitated by microbes when the lake has been dry for so long that phosphorus levels build up, poisoning the microbes. They dispose of the excess phosphorus by excreting hazenite crystals. The crystals disappear when it rains or the lake level rises.

References

Potassium minerals
Sodium minerals
Magnesium minerals
Phosphate minerals
Orthorhombic minerals
Minerals in space group 62